OAV may refer to:

 Original animated video
 Österreichischer Alpenverein (Austrian Alpine Club)
 Object–Agent–Verb (linguistic typology)
 Odour activity value, a measure of importance of a specific compound to the odour of a sample